João Pinto da Piedade, O.P. (Latin: Joannes de Abrantes a Pictate) was a Roman Catholic prelate who served as Bishop of Macau (1604–1623).

Biography
João Pinto da Piedade was born in 1564 in Abrantes, Portugal. He was ordained in the Order of Preachers. On 30 Aug 1604, he was appointed during the papacy of Pope Clement VIII as Bishop of Macau. 
In Nov 1604, he was consecrated bishop. He arrived in India in 1605.
In 1615, he renounced his title and left for Europe with fellow Dominican Antonio de Rosario replacing him as administrator. His resignation was accepted by Pope Urban VIII on 27 October 1623.  He died on 28 Jun 1628.

References

External links
 
  

17th-century Roman Catholic bishops in China
Bishops appointed by Pope Clement VIII
Dominican bishops
1564 births
1628 deaths
People from Abrantes